Helbirga of Austria (died 1142), was a Duchess consort of Bohemia, married to Bořivoj II, Duke of Bohemia.

The great wedding of Helbirga, daughter of Leopold II, Margrave of Austria, to Bořivo II was celebrated in October 1100 in Znojmo.

When Bořivoj fled to Hungary in 1120, she moved back to Austria where her brother Leopold III, Margrave of Austria, granted her sanctuary. She entered Göttweig Abbey where she eventually died in 1142.

References 

Duchesses of Bohemia
1142 deaths
Year of birth unknown
Daughters of monarchs